A timeline of notable events relating to BBC Television News.

1930s
 1936
 2 November – The BBC opens the world's first regular high-definition television service from Alexandra Palace. Television news coverage consists of cinema newsreels from British Movietone News and sound-only news bulletins from BBC Radio.

 1937
 12 May – First use of its TV outside broadcast van to cover the procession that followed the coronation of King George VI and Queen Elizabeth.

 1938
 No events.

 1939
 1 September – The BBC Television Service is suspended, owing to the imminent outbreak of the Second World War.

1940s 
 1940 to 1945
 No events due to television being closed for the duration of the Second World War.

 1946
 7 June – BBC Television broadcasts resume.
 BBC Radio bulletins start being simulcast on television with a still picture of Big Ben.

 1947
 9 November – The first use of telerecording of an outside broadcast, the Service of Remembrance from the Cenotaph is televised live and a telerecording shown that evening.
 20 November – The wedding of Princess Elizabeth and Philip Mountbatten, Duke of Edinburgh is televised by the BBC. It is watched by an estimated 400,000 viewers.

 1948
 5 January – The first edition of Television Newsreel is broadcast. The weeknight programme, broadcast at 7:30pm runs for fifteen minutes.

 1949
 No events.

1950s
 1950
 23 April – The first edition of Children's Newsreel is broadcast.

 1951
 A Sunday version of Television Newsreel, Newsreel Review of the Week, is launched.

 1952
 No events.

 1953
 2 June – The coronation of Queen Elizabeth II in Westminster Abbey is televised by the BBC and watched live by an estimated audience of 20 million people in the United Kingdom.
 11 November – The first edition of Panorama is presented by Daily Mail reporter Pat Murphy. Panorama is the world's longest-running current affairs programme and retains a peak-time slot to this day.

 1954
 5 July – BBC newsreader Richard Baker reads the first televised BBC News bulletin which replaces Television Newsreel.
 7 October – BBC Television covers a party political conference for the first time when it broadcasts from the Conservative Party Conference in Blackpool.

 1955
 September – Kenneth Kendall becomes the BBC's first in-vision newsreader, followed by Richard Baker and Robert Dougall.

 1956
 No events.

 1957
 18 February – The first episode of Tonight is broadcast.
 30 August – BBC Scotland launches a weekday five-minute news bulletin and a Saturday teatime sports round-up. They launch one day before the start of broadcasting by Scottish television which provided its own regional news service from the outset. 
 September – The first broadcasts of regional news bulletins on the BBC take place and bulletins also start being broadcast in Wales and Northern Ireland.
 30 September – Regional television news bulletins for the north of England begin from Piccadilly's studio N in Manchester.

 1958
 28 October – The BBC televises the State Opening of Parliament for the first time.

 1959
 The BBC North East and Cumbria region is created with localised bulletins from Newcastle-upon-Tyne aired for the first time. Previously, the area was part of a pan-Northern region based in Manchester.

1960s

 1960
 No events.

 1961
 September – The final edition of Children's Newsreel is broadcast.

 1962
 17 September – BBC Wales launches Wales Today. The programme is seen by viewers in both Wales and the west of England until February 1964 when the BBC Wales and BBC West regions are created.

 1963
 22 November – BBC TV interrupts regular programming to report the assassination of John F. Kennedy.

 1964
 20 April – BBC2 beings broadcasting and BBC News launches a new news programme for the channel called Newsroom.
 26 April – Another new news programme for BBC2 is launched called News Review. The programme is a summary of the week's news with subtitles for the deaf and hard-of-hearing.

 1965
 18 June – Tonight is broadcast on BBC1 for the final time.

 1966
5 April – The Money Programme debuts on BBC2. It continued to air until 2010.

 1967
 No events.

 1968
 7 March – Newsroom on BBC2 becomes the first UK news programme to be transmitted in colour.
 25 March – BBC regional television from Leeds begins and the first edition of Look North is broadcast. Previously, the Yorkshire area had been part of a wider North region based in Manchester.
 1 April – The first edition of BBC Scotland's Reporting Scotland is broadcast.

 1969
 9 September – The first edition of Nationwide is broadcast on BBC1. 
 19–20 September – BBC News relocates from Alexandra Palace in North London to BBC Television Centre in West London.

1970s
 1970
 BBC News appoints its first political editor with Hardiman Scott being the first person to take on the role.
 14 September – Robert Dougall presents the first edition of the BBC Nine O'Clock News. The programme was launched in response to ITN's News at Ten.

 1971
 No events.

 1972
 4 April – The first edition of Newsround is broadcast, presented by John Craven. 
 29 December – The final edition of BBC2's news programme Newsroom is broadcast. It is replaced by a five-minute news summary.

 1973
 2 January – A new late evening extended news bulletin News Extra begins broadcasting on BBC2.

 1974
 7 January – A two-minute mid-afternoon regional news summary is broadcast on BBC1 for the first time. It is transmitted immediately before the start of the afternoon's children's programmes.
 23 September – Teletext service Ceefax goes live.

 1975
 1 September 
Tonight returns to BBC1 after thirteen years off air. The new programme airs as a late evening news and analysis programme.
BBC2's late evening news bulletin is renamed Newsnight.

 1976
 17 September – The original incarnation of Newsnight is broadcast for the final time. It is replaced three days later with a shorter bulletin called Late Night News on 2.

 1977
 No events.

 1978
 No events.

 1979
 5 July – The final edition of Tonight is broadcast on BBC1.
 25 September – The first edition of Question Time is broadcast on BBC1.

1980s 
 1980
 28 January – Newsnight is launched on BBC2. 
 March – The very first in-vision Ceefax transmissions are broadcast.

 1981
 29 July – The Wedding of Charles, Prince of Wales and Lady Diana Spencer is produced by BBC Television & Radio with an audience of 750 million viewers and listeners in over 60 countries.
 4 September – The final edition of Midday News is broadcast.
 7 September – News After Noon is launched as a 30-minute lunchtime news programme, replacing the much shorter Midday News.

 1982
 BBC News provides extensive coverage of the Falklands War with newsflashes supplemented by additional and extended news bulletins, including weekend editions of Newsnight.
 1 November –  The first edition of Welsh-language news bulletin Newyddion is broadcast on the first night of broadcasting of Wales' new fourth channel S4C.

 1983
 17 January – Breakfast Time, the UK's first national breakfast television service is launched. News bulletins and summaries are broadcast every 15 minutes. 
 5 August – The final edition of Nationwide is broadcast.
 24 October – Sixty Minutes launches as the new evening news programme to replace Nationwide.

 1984
 27 July – The final edition of Sixty Minutes is broadcast.
 30 July – BBC1's teatime news programme reverts to its original name of Evening News and to its original broadcast time of 5:40pm. The regional news programmes follow, broadcasting for 20 minutes from 5:55pm. This is a stop-gap measure and continues for five weeks.
 3 September – BBC1's teatime news hour is relaunched and now runs from 6pm until 7pm. A new 30-minute long news programme the Six O'Clock News is launched and this is followed by a longer regional news magazine which is expanded to 25 minutes.
 18 November – The BBC launches its first Sunday lunchtime political interview show called This Week, Next Week.
 December – BBC1 stops broadcasting a late night news summary.

 1985
 23 January – Television coverage of proceedings in the House of Lords begins.
30 August – The weekday lunchtime Financial Report, broadcast on BBC1 in London and the south east, is broadcast for the final time ahead of the launch of a lunchtime regional news bulletin for viewers in the BBC South East region.
 2 September – A regional news bulletin following the Nine O'Clock News is launched.
 22 December – Having been broadcast every Sunday teatime since the launch of BBC2 in 1964, News Review is broadcast for the final time.

 1986
 4 January – The first edition of NewsView is broadcast on BBC2. The new Saturday early evening programme lasts 40 minutes and combines the day's news with a look back at the week's news.
 9 June – The BBC launches its first parliamentary review programme when the first edition of The Lords This Week (renamed The Week in the Lords later in 1986) is shown on BBC2.
 17 October – BBC2 broadcasts a teatime news summary with subtitles for the last time. For the past three years this bulletin which had been broadcast at around 5:25pm, had been the first programme of the day (apart from educational programmes and sports coverage).
 24 October – Ahead of the launch of the BBC's new daytime service, News After Noon is broadcast for the final time. 
 27 October 
BBC1 starts a full daytime television service. Among the new programmes is a new lunchtime news bulletin, the One O'Clock News. The programme continues to this day.
The weekday mid-afternoon regional news summary moves to BBC2.
10 November – Breakfast Time is relaunched with a more formal news and current affairs format.
 8 December – Six weeks after launching its daytime service, BBC TV starts broadcasting hourly news summaries. Morning bulletins are shown on BBC1 and early afternoon summaries (at 2pm, 3pm and 3:50pm) are shown on BBC2. Each bulletin is followed by a weather forecast.

 1987
 No events.

 1988
 18 September – On the Record replaces This Week Next Week as BBC1's Sunday lunchtime political discussion programme.
 31 October – For the first time, Newsnight is given a fixed starting time, of 10:30pm.

 1989
 22 June – John Craven presents his final edition of Newsround. 
 29 September – The final edition of Breakfast Time is broadcast.
 2 October – The first edition of BBC Breakfast News is broadcast.
 21 November – Television coverage of proceedings in the House of Commons begins and the BBC provides live coverage of Prime Ministers Questions in a twice-weekly programme called Westminster Live. Also, BBC2 launches a weekday breakfast round-up of yesterday's proceedings. This is preceded by the 8am bulletin from Breakfast News.

1990s 
 1990
 14 January – Following the start of television coverage of the House of Commons, the BBC launches a regional politics programme. It forms part of a new Sunday lunchtime Westminster Hour.
 15 October – As part of a relaunch of its weekday morning output, the new service includes hourly regional news summaries, broadcast after the on-the-hour news bulletins.

 1991
 7 January – The BBC East Midlands region is created and the first edition of East Midlands Today is broadcast.
 16 January–2 March – BBC News provides extensive coverage of the Gulf War. In addition to extended news bulletins, a daytime news and analysis programme War in the Gulf is broadcast, presented by David Dimbleby although as the War progresses, War in the Gulf is scaled back to allow BBC1 to resume its regular daytime schedule. 
 NewsView is broadcast on BBC Two for the final time, bringing to an end the weekly news review with on-screen subtitles that BBC Two had broadcast since the channel first went on air in 1964. BBC Two replaces the programme with a standard 15-minute news and sport bulletin.
 15 April – The World Service Television News service is launched. Unlike World Service radio which is funded by direct grant from the Foreign and Commonwealth Office, WSTV is commercially funded and carries advertising which means that it cannot be broadcast in the UK.
 21 September – The BBC launches a five-minute long weekend breakfast news bulletin.

 1992
  No events.

 1993
 3 January – The debut of Breakfast with Frost, a Sunday morning current affairs programme on BBC1 presented by David Frost.
 13 April – For the first time, all BBC News programmes have the same look following a relaunch of all of the main news bulletins.

 1994
 19 September – The BBC launches a weekday lunchtime business, personal finance and consumer news programme called Working Lunch. The programme is broadcast on BBC2 for 42 weeks each year.

 1995
 16 January – BBC World Service Television was renamed as BBC World. It was launched as an international free-to-air news channel on 26 January at 19:00 GMT.
 March – BBC News creates its very first website, for the 1995 Budget.

 1996
 No events.

 1997
 31 August – BBC1 continues to air through the whole night, simulcasting with BBC World News to bring news updates of Diana, Princess of Wales's car accident. At 6am, a rolling news programme is shown on both BBC1 and BBC2 until BBC2 breaks away at 3pm to provide alternative programming. BBC1 continues to provide coverage until closedown when it once again hands over to BBC World. During the following week, BBC1 broadcasts extended news coverage of the events following Princess Diana's death.
 6 September – The funeral of Diana, Princess of Wales is broadcast on BBC Radio & Television and aired to over 200 countries worldwide. Nearly 3 billion viewers and listeners watch and listen to the ceremonies.
 4 November – BBC News Online launches. This follows specially created websites covering the 1997 general election and the death of Princess Diana.
 9 November – BBC News 24 launches at 5:30pm.

 1998
 23 September – Following its purchase of the cable-only Parliamentary Channel, the BBC launches BBC Parliament on digital satellite and analogue cable with an audio feed of the channel on DAB.
 20 October – A new late night programme review of the day's events in Westminster, Despatch Box, is launched. It replaces The Midnight Hour.
 15 November 
 The public launch of digital terrestrial TV in the UK. Consequently, BBC News 24 is now available to all digital viewers for the first time.
 The first edition of UK Today is broadcast. It airs as a replacement for the regional news bulletins because English variations on satellite were not possible due to a single broadcast feed being able to cover the entirety of England (in reality it could cover much of north and western Europe) and also because the regional broadcasting centres had not been upgraded to digital which meant they were unable to opt-out of the network. Therefore, in the initial months of digital television in the UK, BBC regional news was only available to analogue viewers.

 1999
 10 May – BBC network news relaunched with new music, titles and a red and ivory set. This design was used for the 25 October relaunch of News 24, enhancing cross-channel promotion of the service.
 4 October – Newsnight Scotland, the BBC Scotland opt-out of the main Newsnight programme, is launched on BBC Two Scotland.
31 December – Over 60 countries take part in 2000 Today, a programme seeing in the start of the new millennium. In the UK, the 28-hour marathon show is shown on BBC One and hosted by Michael Parkinson, Gaby Roslin and David Dimbleby.

2000s 
 2000
 15 September – The final edition of Breakfast News is broadcast.
 2 October 
The first edition of BBC Breakfast is broadcast on BBC One and News 24 from 6am to 9:30am, to 9am on BBC News 24. 
BBC News starts broadcasting in 16:9 widescreen.
 13 October – The final edition of the BBC Nine O'Clock News is broadcast on BBC One. 
 16 October 
The BBC Ten O'Clock News launches on BBC One amid controversy, having been moved from 9pm to cash in on the axing of ITN's News at Ten the previous year.
Oxfordshire, once part of the South East, becomes part of South Today.

 2001
 16 July – The first edition of 60 Seconds is broadcast on BBC Choice. The bulletin is broadcast on the hour each evening between 7pm and midnight.
 3 September – As part of a major reorganisation of the BBC's south east region, Kent and Sussex get their own news programme called South East Today which replaces Newsroom South East.
 11 September – Viewers around the world witness a terrorist attack on the United States and the collapse of the Twin Towers in New York City, live on television. BBC1 abandons regular programming to provide up to date coverage of unfolding events.
 1 October – BBC London is launched, replacing Newsroom South East.

 2002
 11 February – As part of the launch of the CBBC channel, Newsround is expanded and several editions are broadcast on there throughout the day. 
 30 October – BBC Parliament launches on digital terrestrial television, having previously only been available as an audio-only service. However, capacity limitations mean that the picture is squeezed into just one quarter of the screen.
 11 November – The first edition of a new East Yorkshire and Lincolnshire edition of BBC Look North is broadcast, while the Leeds-based Look North programme now covers the West, North and South Yorkshire and the North Midlands.
 20 December – The final editions of Westminster Live and Despatch Box are broadcast.

 2003
 8 January – As a result of the review of the BBC's political output, coverage of politics on BBC Television is relaunched resulting in the first editions of Daily Politics and its Sunday companion programme the Politics Show.
 16 January – BBC One broadcasts the first edition of This Week.
 9 February –  The launch of BBC Three results in the start of a new news bulletin for the channel called The 7 O'Clock News.
 20 March – As the 2003 invasion of Iraq begins, many broadcasters abandon regular programming to provide up to date coverage of unfolding events.
 UK Today ends after all of the BBC's regional centres are upgraded for digital broadcasting. However, it wasn't until May until all 17 regional services became available on satellite due to the BBC broadcasting all 17 different feeds on 17 different channels on there. The intervening two months see satellite viewers received the BBC South East programme with four other regions available via an interactive service. 
 8 December – BBC News 24 is relaunched with a new set and titles, as well as a new Breaking News sting. Networked news on BBC One and Two remains with the same titles though the set was redesigned in a similar style to that of the new News 24.

 2004
 16 February – Network news titles are relaunched in the style of BBC News 24, introduced two months earlier.

2005
 29 May – The final edition of Breakfast with Frost is broadcast after a twelve-year run.
11 September – BBC One launches Sunday AM, a Sunday morning current affairs programme presented by Andrew Marr.
 20 December – The final edition of BBC Three's weeknight news bulletin The 7 O'Clock News is broadcast.

 2006
31 May – The World on BBC Four is replaced by an edition of World News Today.
13 November – BBC Parliament broadcasts in full-screen format for the first time on the Freeview service, having previously only been available in quarter-screen format. The BBC eventually found the bandwidth to make the channel full-screen after receiving "thousands of angry and perplexed e-mails and letters", not to mention questions asked by MPs in the Houses of Parliament itself.

 2007
 22 January – BBC News 24 is relaunched with new titles and new Astons.
 May – A pilot of a new 8pm BBC News Summary begins in the East Midlands prior to being rolled out across the UK. The summary consists of a national bulletin followed by a regional summary.
9 September – The BBC One Sunday morning political programme Sunday AM is renamed The Andrew Marr Show when it returns after its Summer break.

 2008
 11 March – BBC Arabic Television launches.
 21 April – BBC News 24 and BBC World are renamed BBC News and BBC World News respectively. 
 22 September – The launch of BBC Alba sees the first edition of a new Scottish Gaelic news bulletin An Là.

 2009
 14 January – BBC Persian Television launches.

2010s
2010
30 July – BBC Two broadcasts its final Working Lunch. It is replaced by GMT with George Alagiah.

2011
11 December – The Politics Show is broadcast for the final time.

2012
15 January – The Sunday Politics is broadcast for the first time.
7 March – Brighton moves from South region to South-East region, after the Meridian digital switchover. 
July–September – BBC News Channel, Network bulletin's and BBC World News temporary move output to the Olympic Park in Bow for the duration of the 2012 Olympic Games.
23 October – The BBC's teletext service Ceefax is switched off following all regions switching to digital broadcasting. The very last Pages from Ceefax transmission had taken place two days earlier. 
 21 December – Newsround is broadcast on BBC One for the final time due to the decision to end the BBC One afternoon block of children's programmes.

2013
5 April – BBC Monitoring moves to Licence Fee funding.
10 December – The BBC News Channel starts broadcasting in high definition.

2014
 22 May – As part of a major shake-up in BBC Scotland News and current affairs programmes in the run up to the 2014 Scottish independence referendum, Newsnight Scotland is broadcast for the final time. It is replaced on 28 May by a new programme, Scotland 2016.

2015
 7 April – BBC News launches a new two-hour weekday current affairs programme called The Victoria Derbyshire Show. The programme is broadcast on both BBC Two and the BBC News Channel. 
1 June – BBC World News programmes Outside Source and Business Live make their debut on the BBC News Channel. They appear as a result of cutbacks which also sees the overnight simulcast of BBC World News beginning an hour earlier at midnight.

2016
 16 February – The final edition of 60 Seconds is broadcast on BBC Three. The programme ends due to the closure of BBC Three as a linear television channel.
 14 December – Scotland 2016 is broadcast on BBC Two Scotland for the final time.

2017
 No events.

2018
 30 May – The final 8pm BBC News Summary is broadcast.
 24 July – The final edition of Daily Politics and Sunday spin-off The Sunday Politics) is broadcast, ending a fifteen-year run as BBC News' flagship weekday politics show.
 3 September – The first edition of Politics Live is broadcast.

2019
4 March – The Monday to Thursday editions of BBC News at Ten are cut from 45 minutes to 35 minutes. The reduction affects editions of the national and local news bulletins airing in that timeslot, as well as the post-bulletin weather forecast and is done to make way for a new BBC Three strand of programming, as well as avoiding a clash with the start of BBC Two's Newsnight.
18 July – BBC One broadcasts the final edition of This Week after sixteen years on air. A special live audience edition of the programme marks its finale.
18 November – The BBC announces plans to close its red button text service by the end of 30 January 2020.

2020s
 2020
29 January – The BBC announces that it has suspended its plan to switch-off the BBC Red Button service, one day before the service was due to have started being phased out. The announcement comes following a petition, organised by the National Federation of the Blind of the UK (NFBUK), which was submitted to the BBC and Downing Street. following protests.
17 March – The final edition of The Victoria Derbyshire Show is broadcast to focus on coverage of the COVID-19 pandemic. The programme had been due to come off air later in 2020 due to funding cuts.
30 March – Newsnight moves to a 10:45pm start time. This was due to Newsnight temporarily sharing a studio with BBC News at Ten during the COVID-19 pandemic to cut footfall in Broadcasting House and allow turnover in the studio, due to News at Ten not finishing until 10:35pm. The programme retains its new later start time after moving to a new studio in October.
 July – The teatime edition of Newsround is axed, having been on air since 1972. It ended following the BBC concluding that children no longer turn on traditional television channels when they return home from school and instead the BBC would focus on the morning edition which will be aimed at schools where it is often used by teachers in classrooms.
August – The additional simulcasts between the BBC News Channel and BBC World News are made permanent. Consequently, the two channels now simulcast between each day 10am to 12pm and on weekdays 7pm to 6am with opt-outs for BBC News at Ten and for half an hour at 8:30pm and between 9pm to 6am, apart from the evening BBC One bulletin at the weekend.

 2021
 9 April – At just after midday, Buckingham Palace announces the death of Prince Philip and BBC One, BBC Two, BBC Parliament and BBC World News switch over to BBC News to announce the death. The message was likely received during the top-of-the hour headlines, as the wide-shot in the opening featured multiple journalists running across the room.
 19 December – The final edition of The Andrew Marr Show is broadcast, ending after 15 years ahead of Andrew leaving the BBC.

 2022
 13 June – BBC News unveils its flagship studio for use during  BBC News at Six, BBC News at Ten and BBC Londons local newscasts. The newsroom's new look and technological features are first introduced to the viewing public by Huw Edwards on a report during The One Show with Alex Jones.
 14 July – The BBC sets out plans for a new global news channel titled BBC News. It will replace its two existing news services for the UK and overseas. It is scheduled to launch in April 2023.
 4 September – The first edition of Sunday with Laura Kuenssberg is broadcast. 
 8 September – Just after 6:30pm, Buckingham Palace announces the Death and state funeral of Elizabeth II and BBC One, BBC Two, BBC Parliament and BBC World News switch over to BBC News to announce the death of Elizabeth II. BBC One was already on air covering The Queen's health while they announced it live on air.
 16 December – The Cambridgeshire edition of BBC Look East ends as part of cost-cutting measures across the BBC. The Cambridge studios will close, with all broadcasts returning to their pre-1997 region-wide format broadcast from the existing studios in Norwich. The Oxford edition of South Today will also be scrapped. BBC Local Radio faces significant cuts to programming

 2023'
 3 April – The BBC News Channel will close as a stand-alone UK channel when it is merged with BBC World News. The new single channel will be called BBC News with programmes based on BBC World News output although the ability to break away from international programming for a major UK news story is to be retained and the weekday simulcasts of the BBC One news bulletins will be retained.

See also
Timeline of the BBC News Channel
Timeline of television news in the United Kingdom

References

Television in the United Kingdom by year
BBC television timelines
United Kingdom news broadcasting timelines